Crazy XYZ is a YouTube channel founded by Amit Sharma which has more than 7,000,000,000 views in YouTube.

YouTube channel 
The channel has 17.1 million subscribers in YouTube. Crazy XYZ is top 4th YouTube channel in India.

Amit Sharma 
He was born on September 11, 2000, at Bansur. His parents are teachers. He got degree of B. Tech from IIT Roorkee.

Contents 
Crazy XYZ have uploaded many videos of different content. In some popular videos they:-

 brought room in world's most expensive hotel with price of 2 million per day
 filled petrol of 10 rupees in a car which worth 60 millions
 replaced bike's front wheel with steel drum
 pasted 100 thousands firecracker on car and burst it
 cut brick, fruits and vegetable with water
 booked entire train of Indian Railways
 challenged to not get out of the car for 24 hours
 achieved speed of 100 km per hour at 2 second
 burst 1000 fire crackers together
 gave free petrol offer to all customers
 crushed bike from road roller
 gifted IPhone worth 7 lacs rupee to friends
 slept for 24 hours
 tried to be brought IPhone 14 with 1-rupee coins of 150000 rupee

References 

YouTube channels